Kurtis Imrie (born 1996) is a New Zealand canoeist.

Originally from Wellington, New Zealand, he is the younger brother of women's elite squad paddler, Kayla Imrie. In 2013 he appeared for New Zealand at the Australian Youth Olympic Festival and World Junior Championships, where he finished third in the B Final of the K1 1000m. At the 2014 World Junior Championships, he improved to a fifth-place finish in the K1 1000m A Final. At the 2019 World U23 Championships, Imrie won a K1 500m bronze.

Imrie paddling alongside Max Brown finished eighth in the A Final at the of the K2 1000m at the World Cup in Poznan in 2021 . Coached by Tim Brabants, Kurtis and Max also qualified a New Zealand K2 1000m boat at the 2020 Oceania Canoe Sprint Championships in Sydney. Imrie finished runner up to Brown in the NZCT New Zealand Canoe Sprint Championships at Lake Karapiro in May 2021 in the K1 1000m. The pair teamed up and have been selected to represent New Zealand at the delayed 2020 Summer Games in Tokyo in the K2 1000m where they finished fifth overall.

References

1996 births
Living people
Sportspeople from Wellington City
New Zealand male canoeists
Canoeists at the 2020 Summer Olympics
Olympic canoeists of New Zealand